In geometric topology, a cellular decomposition G of a manifold M is a decomposition of M as the disjoint union of cells (spaces homeomorphic to n-balls Bn).

The quotient space M/G has points that correspond to the cells of the decomposition. There is a natural map from M to M/G, which is given the quotient topology. A fundamental question is whether M is homeomorphic to M/G. Bing's dogbone space is an example with M (equal to R3) not homeomorphic to M/G.

Definition
 Cells are disjoint: for any distinct , .
 No set gets mapped to a negative number: .
 Cells look like balls: For any  and for any  there exists a continuous map  that is an isomorphism  and also .

See also
CW complex

References

Geometric topology